Patrick Anthony McCoy (born December 14, 1980) is a former American football offensive tackle. He was signed by the Philadelphia Eagles of the National Football League (NFL) as an undrafted free agent in 2006. He played college football at West Texas A&M University.

References

1980 births
Living people
American football offensive tackles
Atlanta Falcons players
Philadelphia Eagles players
West Texas A&M Buffaloes football players
People from Fairfield, California
Sportspeople from the San Francisco Bay Area
Players of American football from California